Feelin' Up (also known as Getting Together) is a 1976 comedy film written and directed by David Secter and distributed by Troma Entertainment.

Plot
The plot follows a conservative young man's venture into a world of sexual hijinks.

Tagline: Remember what you felt when you were sixteen?

Cast
Kathleen Seward
Malcolm Groome
Rhonda Hansome

Legacy
The film's most noteworthy impact came when Secter's nephew Joel, who had not been in close contact with his uncle in many years and did not know that his uncle had directed films at all, unwittingly rented the film from a video store in the 1990s. Himself an aspiring filmmaker, he contacted his uncle, and the two collaborated as producers on the 1999 sex comedy film Cyberdorm, although the film was not successful. With even Secter's most historically significant film, Winter Kept Us Warm, nearly forgotten by the early 2000s, the two then collaborated on the 2005 documentary film The Best of Secter and the Rest of Secter, which explored Secter's career from his early success with Winter Kept Us Warm through his decision to abandon filmmaking after Feelin' Up.

References

External links

1976 films
1970s sex comedy films
American independent films
Troma Entertainment films
Films directed by David Secter
Teen sex comedy films
1976 comedy films
1970s English-language films
1976 independent films
1970s American films